Astaneh (also Romanized as Āstāneh) is a village in Hombarat Rural District, in the Central District of Ardestan County, Isfahan Province, Iran. At the 2006 census, its population was 60, in 21 families.

References 

Populated places in Ardestan County